Pierre-Hugues Herbert was the defending champion, but did not participate.

Benoît Paire won the title, defeating Grégoire Barrère in the final, 6–4, 3–6, 6–4.

Seeds

Draw

Finals

Top half

Bottom half

References
 Main Draw
 Qualifying Draw

Open BNP Paribas Banque de Bretagne - Singles
2015 Singles